Óscar Guerrero may refer to:

Óscar Guerrero Silva (1971-2004), Mexican drug lord
Óscar Guerrero (footballer) (born 1985), Colombian footballer